The Idyllwild Town Crier is a local weekly newspaper published out of Idyllwild, California. The Town Crier serves the area of the San Jacinto Mountains in Riverside County, California.  The current owner-operators are Becky Clark and Jack Clark. The paper was founded in 1946 by husband and wife Ernie and Betty Maxwell, and was originally published from the Maxwell's house during its first few years.

History 
The newspaper published its first issue as The Town Crier on Friday, November 1, 1946. The paper was founded by married couple Ernie and Betty Maxwell, a visual artist and a former Broadway dancer, who moved to the town in 1944 during a post-war boom in logging and tourism. The paper was published from their house until at least 1949. Ernie Maxwell continued as editor/publisher until 1957, when he hired an editor and renamed it to the Idyllwild Town Crier, though from 1969 to 1971 the paper used its original name. In 1972, Maxwell sold the paper to Luther and Marilyn Weare. Ernie Maxwell died in 1994.

May 1989, the Weares sold the paper to Chronicle Publishing Company (publisher of the San Francisco Chronicle). The Idyllwild Town Crier changed corporate hands in 1994 when it sold to England-based Tindle Newspaper Group. The paper returned to private ownership in June 2013, when Becky & Jack Clark bought the paper through their newly formed Idyllwild House Publishing Co. Ltd.  Becky is the longest ever employee of the Idyllwild Town Crier, including serving as editor/publisher during some of the Tindle years.

References

External links 
 Official website
 Idyllwild Town Crier at issuu

Mass media in Riverside County, California
Weekly newspapers published in California
1946 establishments in California